Thomas Solomon (born 1969 in Milwaukee, Wisconsin) is an American escape artist and magician.

Early life
As a boy he was fascinated with mechanical devices. Around the age of thirteen, he was apprenticed to a local locksmith in his hometown of Milwaukee, Wisconsin for a summer which led to a fascination with locks and locking devices. Later, when developing an interest in the art of stage magic, he was able to marry his skill at picking locks with those of a magician and to create an act while in his late teens.

He eventually, focused more on the art of escapology although does still perform magic today. As an escape artist, Thomas Solomon has been profiled in The New York Times. He has performed twice at The White House for Presidents Ronald Reagan and later George HW Bush. In 2003, Solomon had his own network television special on Channel 4 in Great Britain in which he escaped a titanium bank safe underwater, escaped a specially bound plastic restraint hanging from the roof of an S&M Club in London, and a high security prison cell. Later in 2007, he shot a pilot for The History Channel in which he escaped the prison cell of Al Capone, the leg irons of Billy the Kid and the holding cell of Lee Harvey Oswald.

Early Twenties and The Great Escape
In Milwaukee, then Chicago, Solomon first presented "The Great Escape," a show combining magic with one escape from a locked chain in which he demonstrated lock-picking. The nightclub, sensing potential asked Solomon to drop the magic and concentrate only on escapes. As a marketing ploy, the nightclub asked participants to bring whatever they wanted to the theatre (handcuffs, locks, and straitjackets) to challenge the magician. Over the course of three years, he suffered numerous injuries but never failed in an escape.

He has performed a variation of this "Challenge Escape Act" at New York City's famed, former club, MK in the flat-iron district.

Founding of Patriotic Performers, USA
Thomas Solomon is co-founder of Patriotic Performers, USA in which he leads a group of performers who donate their time to entertain wounded service members from all branches of the military. Recent engagements have included Walter Reed Army Hospital, Fort Detrick, the US Marine Base in Quantico, Virginia, McGuire Air Force Base, the Wounded Warrior Unit at Fort Dix Army Base and many others. He has received numerous citations, including one from President Barack Obama, Governor Andrew Cuomo of New York and Governor Chris Christie of New Jersey, for his work on behalf of wounded veterans.

Accomplishments and Recent Work
By 2013, Solomon had escaped from more than 5500 pairs of handcuffs of all different types from all times in history. He has performed numerous underwater releases from restraints in the Hudson and East Rivers, Boston Harbor, Potomac River, Mississippi, and numerous others. He won the coveted "World's Greatest Escape Artist" award from the Academy of Magical Arts and Sciences. He performed his award-winning handcuff escape act, escaping the restraints of the Los Angeles Police Department on the televised World Magic Awards in 2000. 
He has accomplished hundreds of straitjacket releases, most notably an escape from the all-leather straitjacket specifically created to thwart him by Menkes Leather Works. He escaped a tightly bound straitjacket in the pouring rain hanging upside down from a tower crane 150 feet above the street in Portland, Oregon in 2006.

He has performed his award-winning handcuff act (2000 World Magic Awards, PAX Television) at The Roxy, The Magic Castle, Bally's and many others. He has performed aboard ships for Royal Caribbean Cruise Line traveling throughout Bermuda and the Caribbean. In 1988 he entertained President Ronald Reagan at the White House where he escaped the handcuffs of the Uniformed Secret Service. He performed again in 1989 for President George Bush and Vice-President Dan Quayle at the White House. He has performed escapes and magic for major trade show clients, Ford Motor Company, State Farm Insurance, Procter & Gamble, Absolut Vodka, 'Winston/Salem Cigarettes, Compaq Computers, Deutsche Bank, Birdseye Frozen Foods, Black and Decker among others. He starred in the Off-Broadway show, theatre of the Macabre which played three years and more than 1700 performances in Manhattan's Greenwich Village.

Recently, Solomon thrilled spectators with an underwater handcuff performance at the New York Aquarium in which members of the New York Police Department locked him in four pairs of handcuffs. In forty degree frigid water, he escaped in less than three minutes thrilling onlookers. His escape, itself a promotion to help bring attention to the Aquarium's 100 million dollar rehabilitation was widely covered by the media.

In 2011, the Society of American Magicians selected Thomas Solomon to star in the storied "Salute To Magic" which has seen some of magic's greatest names as performers. Solomon combined award-winning escapes and magic into a highly theatrical two-hour show that was reminiscent of a Broadway production. The show was performed at El Teatro—El Museo Del Barrio Theatre, New York City's landmark theatre on Manhattan's Upper West Side.

Solomon recently performed live on the Plaza outside for Fox Television network's "Fox and Friends" in which he escaped five pairs of handcuffs in full view of the audience in under one minute.

Cryptography
Solomon also has a fascination with ciphers, codes and other wordplay. He is an amateur cryptographer and commented recently on an article about on-line security in Wired Magazine in which he gave his solution to making passwords more secure. His posters, some images, his promotional decks of playing cards, DVDs and other items often contain hidden messages; some are written in cipher or code. Others are written backwards or worked in with graphics (as in the blue poster). He has used palindromes, recursive acronyms, Morse code and other devices to conceal messages, solutions to an escape, names or important dates related to the image. In a promotional picture for The History Channel taken of him on the New York City subway, there are no less than six hidden images and written messages buried within the picture.

Published works

 "Diaries of an Escape Artist" (1999),
 "Escape!!!" (2003)
 "Escape Velocity" (2004)

References and citations

 The Chicago Tribune, TEMPO Section, December, 1986
 The Milwaukee Journal, November, 1982
 The Magic Circular—Escape Velocity, 2003—2006
 Interview, The Magic Circular, December 2005
 GENII, The Conjurors Magazine, September 2003
 Interview—The Times—August 2003
 The New York Times, Jogging Shoes and Magic Tricks, March 18, 2012, Metropolitan section page 2
 Wired Magazine, February 2013
 The Brooklyn Paper, March 22–28, 2012
 Brooklyn Courier Life, Bay News, March 8–14, 2012

American magicians
Escapologists
Living people
1969 births
People from Milwaukee